One More Chance,  is a 2005 Singaporean comedy drama film directed by Jack Neo, Michael Woo and Nan Sing Toh.

Plot
Chin Wu Huang, the head of an investment company is arrested for fraud. In jail, he is put in the same cell as compulsive gambler Ong Beng Kuang and serial housebreaker Goh Chun Hwee. When he is released, he struggles to get a job.

Cast
 Mark Lee as Chin Wu Huang
 Marcus Chin as Ong Beng Kuang
 Henry Thia as Goh Chun Hwee
 Apple Hong as Bee Poh
 Lina Ng
 Chen Hong
 Megan Zheng as Chin Xiaowei

Release
The film released in theatres in Singapore on 2 September 2005.

Reception
Li Yiyun of Lianhe Zaobao rated the film three-and-a-half stars for entertainment and two-and-a-half stars for art. Lin Zengyin of Lianhe Wanbao rated the film three stars out of five. Ngiam Ying Lan of The Business Times rated the film C, writing "It's understandable that box-office receipts is the foremost consideration for Neo, easily Singapore's most prolific filmmaker. But what's regrettable is this run-of-the-mill superficial layering of toilet humour and glib coffeeshop chatter, with no payoff in sight. The ending is so lamentably literal one wonders if Neo ever gets tired of rehashing what's already been flogged to death in countless classroom debates and periodic public controversies."

References

External links
 

2005 films
2005 comedy-drama films
Singaporean comedy-drama films